Inside or Outside is a 2016 Chinese action thriller directed by Gary Mak and written by Zhong Muxuan. The film stars Simon Yam, Wallace Huo, Jang Hyuk, Rayza and Che Xiao. The film was released in China on 22 January 2016.

Cast
 Simon Yam as Fei Xin, a detective of high intelligence.
 Wallace Huo as Xie Tianyou, a hacker.
 Wallace Huo as Qiu Le, a police officer.
 Jang Hyuk as Ou Jian, a software designer.
 Rayza as Nan Fang, a fairy tale young writer.
 Che Xiao as Shen Jiamei, a fashion designer, Du Bi's wife and Nan Fang's best friend,

Special appearance
 Jack Kao as Du Bi, the gang leader.
 Andrew Lin as Chen Chaoyi, a detective.
 Han Ji-seok as South Korean gang young leader.
 Aisa Senda as Tang Shan
 Fu Lei as Director Wu

Production
Production began in Taiwan on 14 April 2015.

On 21 June 2015, the film crew attended the 18th Shanghai International Film Festival.

On 16 November 2015, the theme song, Inside or Outside, was released. The ending theme, The Truth, was released on 3 December.

Music
 Theme song: Inside or Outside, lyrics by Zhong Muxuan, composed by Tan Yizhe, sung by Aska Yang.
 Ending theme: The Truth, lyrics by Dai Baojing, Ti Yi'en and Li Tingyao, composed by Dai Baojing and Ti Yi'en, sung by Dai Baojing and Aisa Senda,

Release
The film premiered in Beijing on 18 January 2016 with wide-release in China on 22 January.

References

External links
 
 

2016 films
2016 action thriller films
Chinese action thriller films
Chinese detective films
Police detective films
Films set in Taiwan
Films shot in Taiwan
2010s Mandarin-language films